Kurungalore  is a village in the Arimalamrevenue block of Pudukkottai district 
, Tamil Nadu, India.

Demographics 

As per the 2001 census, Kurungalore had a total population of  
1244 with 578 males and 666 females. Out of the total  
population 678 people were literate.

References

Villages in Pudukkottai district